El Santo de la Espada (in English, The Saint of the Sword) is a 1970 Argentine historical epic film directed by Leopoldo Torre Nilsson and starring Alfredo Alcón. It narrates the life of José de San Martín.  It was written by Beatriz Guido and Luis Pico Estrada, based on the eponymous novel by Ricardo Rojas. The script was supervised by the Sanmartinian National Institute. It had a great success, and it is the most successful movie about "El Libertador" San Martín, although it received some negative reviews due to historical inaccuracies.

Synopsis 
The story relates the life and career of José de San Martín during the South American wars of independence. It starts with his return to Mendoza province, with the rest of the narration being  told as a flashback.

Cast 

 Alfredo Alcón as José de San Martín
 Evangelina Salazar as Remedios de Escalada
 Lautaro Murúa as Bernardo O'Higgins
 Ana María Picchio
 Héctor Alterio as Simón Bolivar
 Héctor Pellegrini
 Alfredo Iglesias
 Mario Casado
 Walter Soubrié
 Fernando Lewiz
 Onofre Lovero
 Miguel Bermúdez
 Juan Carlos Lamas
 Diego Varzi
 Aldo Barbero
 Eduardo Pavlovsky

 Leonor Benedetto
 Eduardo Humberto Nóbili
 Rodolfo Brindisi
 Luis Manuel de la Cuesta
 Carlos Lucini
 Miguel Herrera
 Marcelo Miró
 Hugo Arana
 Ramón Cas
 Carlos Davis
 Rubén Green
 José Slavin
 Leonor Manso
 Alejo Patricio López Lecube
 Mercedes Sosa

History 
The role of San Martín was played by Alfredo Alcón. Evangelina Salazar represented Remedios de Escalada, San Martin's wife. Other important actors included were Lautaro Murúa, Héctor Alterio and Alfredo Iglesias; Leonor Benedetto, Rubén Green and Hugo Arana were novice actors by that time, and eventually developed notable careers afterwards.

Most of the film was made in the south of the province of Mendoza, starting by the end of 1968. Some relevant parts of San Martín's life were not covered: The battles of San Martín in Spain are not included, starting instead with his arrival to Buenos Aires and the First Triumvirate requesting him to create the Regiment of Mounted Grenadiers.

His relation with Remedios de Escalada receives an important coverage, but with an important fact left unattended: after the emancipation of Chile and Peru, San Martín resigns to his powers in Peru after his meeting with Simon Bolivar, in the Guayaquil conference; he returns to Mendoza, upon receiving a letter informing him of the grave illness of Remedios. When he returned to Mendoza, he found Remedios already dead.

It was premiered in Mendoza on March 25, 1970, and quickly became a blockbuster. A few months later, a group of revisionists created a documental movie about San Martín, in an effort to make clear some events the film narrated.

See also 
 José de San Martín

References

External links 
 
 Entry at Cinenacional.com

Works about the Argentine War of Independence
Films set in the 1810s
Films set in the 1820s
Argentine biographical films
José de San Martín
1970 films
Epic films
1970s Spanish-language films
Films set in Argentina
Films directed by Leopoldo Torre Nilsson
Argentine war films
Cultural depictions of José de San Martín
Cultural depictions of Simón Bolívar
1970s biographical films
1970 war films